Lac des Miroirs (English translation: Mirrors Lake) is a lake in Condette in the north of France.

The lake is situated between the village of Condette and the seaside resort of Hardelot, near the Écault Forest and the Hardelot Castle.

Until 2009, the lake was a place dedicated to leisure activities, with the possibility to do pedal boat or fishing. Around the lake, there were little restaurants, a gaming room, some rides and a small train.

Between 2009, it is the center of a nature reserve. The lake is fitted out for the walk. The flora and fauna are protected.

Miroirs
Landforms of the Pas-de-Calais